Parapoynx stagnalis, the rice case bearer or rice caseworm, is a species of moth in the family Crambidae. It has a wide distribution and is found in India, Sri Lanka, South-East Asia, South Africa, South America, southern Europe (Spain and Greece), Russia and Australia (the Northern Territory and Queensland).

Description
The life cycle is completed in about 35–40 days. The length of the forewings is 16 mm. Adult has whitish wings with pale brown wavy markings. There are two black comma-shaped marks on each forewing. Male can be identified by narrow and uniform abdomen, whereas female abdomen is widest at the middle but tapering posteriorly. Female usually lay 150 eggs and first instar larvae emerge after a week. Final larva emerge after 20 days, and reaches its maximum length of 10-12mm. The moth has six larval instars. Due to branched tubular gills, caterpillars can respire in aquatic media. Therefore, instar can disperse through water. Pupation occurs when the pupal case is attached to the leaf sheath above the water level. After a week of pupation, adult emerges.

Ecology
As its common name implies, rice caseworm is one of the major pests of rice throughout the world. Larvae is the infective stage, where they cut leaf tips to make leaf cases. The infestation can be characterized by ladder-like skeletonized tissues in leaves. Larvae completely consume the leaf blade, where only mid rib is visible. Surrounding weeds are the secondary hosts for the moth.

Control
Eggs of rice caseworm can be controlled by using snails. Larvae can be controlled by using many natural predators like water beetles of the families Hydrophilidae and Dytiscidae. Pupal stages can be eradicate by the introduction of Pediobius and Apsilops species. Adult moths are daily meal for many spiders, insect eating bird species and dragonflies. Other than biological methods, many traditional methods such as reducing the water level of paddy fields, crop rotation, crop sanitation, pruning, light traps and hand picking are also effective. Chemicals such as DDT, BHC or Carbaryl can be used in required concentrations.

References

External links
Yield loss in rice caused by the caseworm Nymphula depunctalis Guenee (Lepidoptera: Pyralidae).
Natural Enemies of the Rice Caseworm Nymphula Depunctalis (Guenée) (Lepidoptera: Pyralidae)
Research on Nymphula depunctalis
Yield loss in rice caused by the caseworm Nymphula depunctalis
Effect of Stocked Fish on Rice Leaffolder Cnaphalocrocis medinalis and Rice Caseworm Nymphula depunctalis Populations in Intensive Rice Culture

Moths described in 1852
Acentropinae
Moths of Madagascar
Moths of Japan
Lepidoptera of Mozambique
Lepidoptera of West Africa
Insects of Malawi
Moths of Europe
Moths of Africa